A  (from the Latin word ) is an amphitheatre-like valley formed by glacial erosion. A cirque may also be a similarly shaped landform arising from fluvial erosion.

The concave shape of a glacial cirque is open on the downhill side, while the cupped section is generally steep. Cliff-like slopes, down which ice and glaciated debris combine and converge, form the three or more higher sides. The floor of the cirque ends up bowl-shaped, as it is the complex convergence zone of combining ice flows from multiple directions and their accompanying rock burdens. Hence, it experiences somewhat greater erosion forces and is most often overdeepened below the level of the cirque's low-side outlet (stage) and its down-slope (backstage) valley. If the cirque is subject to seasonal melting, the floor of the cirque most often forms a tarn (small lake) behind a dam, which marks the downstream limit of the glacial overdeepening. The dam itself can be composed of moraine, glacial till, or a lip of the underlying bedrock.

A common feature for all fluvial-erosion cirques is a terrain which includes erosion resistant upper structures overlying materials which are more easily eroded.

Formation

Glacial-erosion cirque formation
Glacial cirques are found amongst mountain ranges throughout the world; 'classic' cirques are typically about one kilometer long and one kilometer wide. Situated high on a mountainside near the firn line, they are typically partially surrounded on three sides by steep cliffs. The highest cliff is often called a headwall. The fourth side forms the lip, threshold or sill, the side at which the glacier flowed away from the cirque. Many glacial cirques contain tarns dammed by either till (debris) or a bedrock threshold.  When enough snow accumulates, it can flow out the opening of the bowl and form valley glaciers which may be several kilometers long.

Cirques form in conditions which are favorable; in the Northern Hemisphere the conditions include the north-east slope, where they are protected from the majority of the Sun's energy and from the prevailing winds. These areas are sheltered from heat, encouraging the accumulation of snow; if the accumulation of snow increases, the snow turns into glacial ice. The process of nivation follows, whereby a hollow in a slope may be enlarged by ice segregation weathering and glacial erosion. Ice segregation erodes the vertical rock face and causes it to disintegrate, which may result in an avalanche bringing down more snow and rock to add to the growing glacier. Eventually, this hollow may become large enough that glacial erosion intensifies. The enlarging of this open ended concavity creates a larger leeward deposition zone, furthering the process of glaciation. Debris (or till) in the ice also may abrade the bed surface; should ice move down a slope it would have a 'sandpaper effect' on the bedrock beneath, on which it scrapes.

Eventually, the hollow may become a large bowl shape in the side of the mountain, with the headwall being weathered by ice segregation, and as well as being eroded by plucking. The basin will become deeper as it continues to be eroded by ice segregation and abrasion. Should ice segregation, plucking and abrasion continue, the dimensions of the cirque will increase, but the proportion of the landform would remain roughly the same. A bergschrund forms when the movement of the glacier separates the moving ice from the stationary ice, forming a crevasse. The method of erosion of the headwall lying between the surface of the glacier and the cirque's floor has been attributed to freeze-thaw mechanisms. The temperature within the bergschrund changes very little, however, studies have shown that ice segregation (frost shattering) may happen with only small changes in temperature. Water that flows into the bergschrund can be cooled to freezing temperatures by the surrounding ice, allowing freeze-thaw mechanisms to occur.

If two adjacent cirques erode toward one another, an arête, or steep sided ridge, forms. When three or more cirques erode toward one another, a pyramidal peak is created. In some cases, this peak will be made accessible by one or more arêtes. The Matterhorn in the European Alps is an example of such a peak.

Where cirques form one behind the other, a cirque stairway results, as at the Zastler Loch in the Black Forest.

As glaciers can only originate above the snowline, studying the location of present-day cirques provides information on past glaciation patterns and on climate change.

Fluvial-erosion cirque formation

Although a less common usage, the term cirque is also used for amphitheatre-shaped, fluvial-erosion features.

Yet another type of fluvial erosion-formed cirque is found on Réunion island, which includes the tallest volcanic structure in the Indian Ocean. The island consists of an active shield-volcano and an extinct, deeply eroded volcano (Piton des Neiges). Three cirques have eroded there in a sequence of agglomerated, fragmented rock and volcanic breccia associated with pillow lavas overlain by more coherent, solid lavas.

A common feature for all fluvial-erosion cirques is a terrain which includes erosion resistant upper structures overlying materials which are more easily eroded.

Notable cirques

 Australia
 Blue Lake Cirque, New South Wales, Australia
 Asia
Chandra Taal, Himachal Pradesh, India
 Cirque Valley, Hindu Kush, Pakistan
 Makhtesh Ramon, Negev desert, Israel
 Western Cwm, Khumbu Himal, Nepal
 Europe (glacial)
Cadair Idris, Wales
Circo de Gredos, Sierra de Gredos, Spain
 Cirque de Gavarnie, Pyrenees, France
 Cirque d'Estaubé, Pyrenees, France
 Cirque de Troumouse, Pyrenees, France
 Cirque du Fer à Cheval, Savoy Alps, France
 Maritsa cirque, Rila Mountain, Bulgaria
 Malyovitsa cirque, Rila Mountain, Bulgaria
 Seven Rila Lakes cirques, Rila Mountain, Bulgaria
 Banderishki cirque, Pirin Mountain, Bulgaria
 , Grampian Mountains, Scottish Highlands
 Śnieżne Kotły, Karkonosze, Poland
 Coumshingaun Lake, County Waterford, Ireland 
 Europe (fluvial)
 Cirque de Navacelles, Grande Causses, France
 Cirque du Bout du Monde, Grande Causses, France
 Cirque du Bout du Monde, Burgundy, France
 North America
Cirque of the Towers, Wyoming, United States
 Iceberg Cirque, Montana, US
 Summit Lake cirque, and others on Mount Evans, Colorado, US
 Great Basin and others on Mount Katahdin, Maine, US
 Great Gulf, New Hampshire, US
 Tuckerman Ravine, New Hampshire, US

See also

References
Notes

Footnotes

External links

 Photographs and case study of corrie glaciers

 
Glaciology
Glacial landforms
Oronyms

es:Glaciar#Clasificación